Pomory  may refer to:

  Pomors, a collective name for the Russian people who live on the shores of the White Sea, Russia
  Pomortsy, a branch of bezpopovtsy Old Believers